Richard Paris (8 April 1942 – 4 October 2017) was an Australian cyclist. He competed in the 1000m time trial at the 1964 Summer Olympics. Paris set the fastest time in the amateur Goulburn to Sydney Classic in 1973 run in reverse direction from Milperra to Goulburn.

References

1942 births
2017 deaths
Australian male cyclists
Olympic cyclists of Australia
Cyclists at the 1964 Summer Olympics
Place of birth missing
Commonwealth Games medallists in cycling
Commonwealth Games gold medallists for Australia
Cyclists at the 1974 British Commonwealth Games
Medallists at the 1974 British Commonwealth Games